The 2013–14 Michigan State Spartans men's basketball team represented Michigan State University in the 2013–14 college basketball season. The Spartans, led by 19th-year head coach Tom Izzo, played their home games at the Breslin Center in East Lansing, Michigan as members of the Big Ten Conference. MSU finished the season with a record of 29–9, 12–6 to finish in a tie for second place in Big Ten play. As the No. 3 seed in the Big Ten tournament, the Spartans defeated Northwestern, Wisconsin, and Michigan (avenging to regular season losses to the Wolverines) to win the tournament championship. As a result, they received the conference's automatic bid to the NCAA tournament, MSU's 17th straight trip. As the No. 4 seed in the East region, they defeated Delaware, Harvard, and No. 1-seeded Virginia to reach the Elite Eight where they lost to eventual National Champion, UConn. The loss marked the first time in Tom Izzo's career that a player who played four years for Izzo had failed to reach a Final Four.

Previous season 
The Spartans finished the 2012–13 season with an overall record of 27–9, 13–5 to finish in second place in the Big Ten. Michigan State received a No. 3 seed in the NCAA tournament, their 16th straight trip to the Tournament, and advanced to the Sweet Sixteen before losing to Duke.

Offseason 
The Spartans lost Derrick Nix (9.9 points and 6.6 rebounds per game) to graduation following the season.

2013 recruiting class
Coach Tom Izzo heavily recruited number two overall recruit Jabari Parker for his 2013 class hoping to make it the centerpiece for the recruiting class. Michigan State, however, lost out to Duke on Parker and other top recruits.

Season summary
Michigan State began the season looking to continue Tom Izzo's Final Four streak: every player who had played four years for Izzo had made at least one Final Four. For the first time under Izzo, the team selected no captains.

Seniors Adreian Payne (16.4 points and 7.3 rebounds per game) and Keith Appling (11.2 points and 4.5 assists per game), junior Branden Dawson (11.2 points and 8.3 rebounds per game), and sophomore Gary Harris (16.7 points and 4.0 rebounds per game) led the Spartans as they looked to continue Izzo's Final Four streak.

MSU started the preseason ranked No. 2 overall and, after beating No. 1 Kentucky in the Champions Classic, the Spartans moved to the No. 1 spot. The Spartans held the No. 1 spot for three weeks while beating Columbia, Portland, Virginia Tech, and Oklahoma to win the Coaches vs. Cancer Classic. They surrendered the No. 1 ranking with a loss to North Carolina in the ACC-Big Ten Challenge. The Spartans cruised through the remaining non-conference schedule,  A win at Texas topped off an 11–1 non-conference record and left the Spartans ready to begin the Big Ten season ranked No. 5 in the country.

The Spartans won their first seven conference games with wins over Penn State, Indiana (twice), Minnesota, Northwestern, Illinois, and No. 3 Ohio State. Without Dawson and Payne due to injuries, MSU lost its first Big Ten game at home to No. 21 Michigan in East Lansing on a College Gameday game. The Spartans also lost to Georgetown in a non-conference game at Madison Square Garden on February 1. Due to injuries to Appling and further injuries to Payne and Dawson, MSU lost five of their last eight conference games to finish in a second-place tie with Wisconsin at 12–6. Michigan State finished the regular season at 23–8 overall and ranked No. 22 in the country.

The Spartans, finally healthy and at full strength, beat Northwestern, No. 12 Wisconsin, and No. 8 Michigan to capture the Big Ten tournament championship. This marked Michigan State's fourth tournament championship, tying them with Ohio State for the conference record. As a result, MSU earned the conference's automatic bid to the NCAA Tournament for the 17th consecutive year.

Michigan State received the No. 4 seed in the East Region. With wins against Delaware and Harvard, they advanced to the Sweet Sixteen for the third straight year and the 12th time 17 years. They defeated No. 1-seeded Virginia in the Sweet Sixteen to advance to the Elite Eight for the first time since 2010. There they fell to No. 7 seed and eventual National Champion, UConn. With the loss, Tom Izzo's Final Four streak ended.

Shortly after the season, Gary Harris declared for the NBA draft.

Roster

Schedule and results

|-
!colspan=9 style=| Exhibition
|-

|-
!colspan=9 style=| Regular season
|-

|-
!colspan=9 style=|Big Ten tournament
|-

|-
!colspan=9 style=|NCAA tournament
|-

Player statistics

Rankings

*AP does not release post-NCAA tournament rankings

Awards and honors 
 Keith Appling - All Big Ten Honorable Mention, NABC All-District Second Team
 Branden Dawson - Most Outstanding Player, Big Ten tournament
 Gary Harris - All Big Ten First Team, NABC All-District First Team, USBWA All-District Team, Big Ten All-Tournament Team
 Adreian Payne - All-Big Ten First Team, NABC All-District Second Team, USBWA All-District Team, Big Ten All-Tournament Team
 Denzel Valentine - All Big Ten Honorable Mention

References

Michigan State Spartans men's basketball seasons
Michigan State
Michigan State
2013 in sports in Michigan
2014 in sports in Michigan
Big Ten men's basketball tournament championship seasons